HSMM is an acronym that can have multiple meanings:

Hidden semi-Markov model, a statistical model.
High Speed Multimedia, an amateur radio project using 802.11 wireless networking hardware.